The Oratorio Society of New York is a not-for-profit membership organization that performs choral music in the oratorio style. Founded in 1873 by conductor Leopold Damrosch and is the third oldest musical organization in New York City. The Society had a prominent role in the building of Carnegie Hall. Throughout its history, it has premiered many new choral works.

Kent Tritle was appointed as the Society's 11th music director in January 2006, succeeding Lyndon Woodside.

History
Various individuals are credited with inspiring Damrosch's decision to found the Society: Anton Rubinstein, Marie Reno (wife of the Society's secretary Morris Reno), Elkan and Bertha Naumburg, and three unnamed women who felt New York needed a singing society like the ones they had heard on a recent trip to Germany. Bertha Naumburg is said to have suggested the name. 

Rehearsals at the Society began in March 1873.  On December 3, the Society presented its first concert. One year later, on Christmas night, the Society began what has become an unbroken tradition of annual performances of Handel's Messiah. In 1885, Walter Damrosch, the son of Leopold Damrosch, became conductor after his father's death. 

In 1884 Andrew Carnegie joined the Society's board of directors, serving as its president from 1888 to 1919. Three years later, Carnegie added his support to a fund to build a hall that was suitable for choral music. He engaged  architect William Tuthill, to design the "Music Hall," now known as Carnegie Hall. Carnegie hall opened in May 1891 with a five-day festival. 
  
In April 1923 the Society, in conjunction with the experimental radio station, WEAF, presented the first choral concert broadcast from Carnegie Hall. 

The Society has presented the U.S. premiere of Brahms' A German Requiem (1877), Berlioz' Roméo et Juliette (1882), a full-concert production of Wagner's Parsifal at the Metropolitan Opera House (1886), Tchaikovsky's a cappella Legend and Pater noster (1891) and Eugene Onegin (1908), the now-standard version of The Star-Spangled Banner (1917), Bach's Mass in B Minor (1927), Dvořák's Saint Ludmila (1993), Britten's The World of the Spirit (1998), and Filas' Song of Solomon (2012).  The Society has also presented works by Handel, Liszt, Schütz, Schubert, Debussy, Elgar, and Saint-Saëns.

Outreach
In 1977, the Society inaugurated an oratorio solo competition. International in scope, it is the only significant competition devoted to oratorio solos. In 2006, the competition was renamed the Lyndon Woodside Oratorio-Solo Competition in honor of Lyndon Woodside. 

The Society's education program offers high school students in New York City classroom instruction and free tickets to its concerts. It also reaches out to teens by contributing tickets to High 5 Tickets to the Arts. The Society was instrumental in the 2010 founding of the New York Choral Consortium, a member organization comprising 65 choral groups—professional and avocational—throughout the metropolitan area.

Awards and honors
On its 100th anniversary in 1973, the Society was presented with the Handel Medallion for its contributions to the musical life of the city. At its May 1998 125th anniversary concert, the Society was honored by Mayor Rudolph Giuliani as: "One of the most treasured institutions of our city's musical life . . . making all New York music lovers grateful for this venerable institution which helps keep our city the music capital of the world."

In March 2003, the Society received the UNESCO Commemorative Medal and the Cocos Island World Natural Heritage Site Award for its series of benefit concerts in Costa Rica. In 2004 the Society received a certificate from the St. Petersburg Submariners Club commemorating its concerts there.

Tours
The Society made its European debut in Munich in 1982. Since then it has performed throughout Europe and in Asia and Latin America. In 2015, the Society performed in Halle, Quedlinburg, Dresden, and Leipzig. In 2017, the Society performed at the Teatro Solís in Montevideo, Uruguay.

Music directors

Presidents

Works conducted by their composers

References
Notes

Sources
Archives of the Oratorio Society of New York, 1873–present.
Damrosch, Walter. My Musical Life. New York: Charles Scribner's Sons, 1926.
Hendrick, Burton J. and Daniel Henderson. Louise Whitfield Carnegie: The Life of Mrs. Andrew Carnegie. New York: Hastings House, 1950.
Krehbiel, H. E., Choral Music in New York: Notes on the Cultivation of Choral Music and the Oratorio Society of New York. 1894.
Martin, George. The Damrosch Family. Boston: Houghton Mifflin, 1983.
Stebbins, Lucy Poate and Richard Poate Stebbins. Frank Damrosch: Let the People Sing. Durham: Duke University Press, 1945.

External links

Carnegie Hall official site

The New York Times review of December 21, 2011 concert
The New York Times review of March 13, 2007 concert
List of significant cultural institutions in New York City, New York Public Library

Choirs in New York City
Charities based in New York City
Arts organizations based in New York City
Musical groups from New York City
1873 establishments in New York (state)
Musical groups established in 1873